Bizzelli is a surname. Notable people with the surname include:

Annibale Bizzelli (1900–1967), Italian composer
Giovanni Bizzelli (1556–1607 or 1612), Italian painter

See also
Bizzell

Italian-language surnames